Dodda Balakoti Reddy served as the Member of the Legislative Assembly for Sattenapalli constituency in Andhra Pradesh, India, between 1989 and 1994. He represented the Indian National Congress.

References

Andhra Pradesh MLAs 1989–1994
Indian National Congress politicians from Andhra Pradesh
Possibly living people
Telugu politicians
Year of birth missing